is a passenger railway station located in the town of Tsurugi, Mima District, Tokushima Prefecture, Japan. It is operated by JR Shikoku and has the station number "B18".

Lines
Besides local trains, the Tsurugisan limited express service also stops at Sadamitsu.

Layout
The station consists of an island platform serving 2 tracks. A siding and a passing loop branch off track 2. Access to the island platform from the station building is by means of a level crossing and ramp. The station is unstaffed by JR Shikoku but a tenant has leased part of the building for office space and operates the ticket window (equipped with a POS ticket machine) as a kan'i itaku agent.

Adjacent stations

History
With the privatization of Japanese National Railways (JNR), the successor to JGR, on 1 April 1987, Sadamitsu came under the control of JR Shikoku. On 1 June 1988, the line was renamed the Tokushima Line.

Surrounding area
Tokushima Prefectural Tsurugi High School
Tsurugi Town Hall
Tsurugi Municipal Sadamitsu Elementary School
Tsurugi Municipal Sadamitsu Junior High School

See also
 List of Railway Stations in Japan

References

External links

 JR Shikoku timetable

Railway stations in Tokushima Prefecture
Railway stations in Japan opened in 1914
Tsurugi, Tokushima